Frid is a Scandinavian (Norse) surname, derived from the name of the god Frey (Freyr) - same derivation as the day of the week (Tuesday -Tws Norse god of the sea, Wednesday -Wodin/Odin father of the gods, Thursday - Thor's day and Fri day - Freyr) (Names of the days of the week).  

Frid is often translated from modern Swedish as meaning peace.  

Frid features in the sagas as the name of a Valkyrie and the modern (English) spelling may derive from the old Norse rendering of Frið.

It may refer to: 

People

 Amelia Frid, an Australian actress
 Egon Frid (born 1957), Swedish politician
 Géza Frid, a Hungarian/Dutch composer and pianist
 Grigory Frid, a Russian composer
 Jonathan Frid, a Canadian actor
 Tage Frid, a Danish born American woodworker
 Valeri Frid, a Soviet scriptwriter
 also

 Frid Ingulstad, a Norwegian novelist
 Anni-Frid Lyngstad, a Norwegian-Swedish singer, member of ABBA

 Other

 Florida Registry of Interpreters for the Deaf

See also  
Frederick (given name)
Fried (surname)
Freed (disambiguation)

References  

Surnames